Mister Dominican Republic (Spanish: Mister República Dominicana) is a pageant where men ranging from the ages of 18 to 30 compete, each representing their country to the male international pageants.

Organization
Mister Dominican Republic is the official platform for the most important male pageants of the planet: Mister International, Mister Supranational, Mister Global and Manhunt International. Also part of the semi-finalist will be representing the Dominican Republic in some other Male pageants around the world. The MDRP (Mister Dominican Republic Pageant) is led by Anthony Santana, MDR 2012. The current titleholder is Christian Román Puigbó of Punta Cana who was crowned on 21 May 2019 at the Auditorio Patrick N. Hughson Dominico Americano in Santo Domingo.

Mister Dominican Republic

Mister Dominican Republic International
The winner of Mister Dominican Republic represents Dominican Republic at the Mister International. On occasion, when the winner does not qualify, the runner-up is sent.

Mister Dominican Republic Supranational

Mister Dominican Republic Global

Caballero Universal Dominican Republic

Manhunt International Dominican Republic

Mister Mundo República Dominicana

Mister Mundo República Dominicana is a pageant that was made 2007. Since that year Mister Dominican Republic World collaborates with Reina Nacional de Belleza (Miss Mundo Dominicana) together. Dominican Republic has participated at the Mister World since 1996.

Man of the World Dominican Republic

Batch of Mister Dominican Republic 

The titleholders that will represent the Dominican Republic at the most important male beauty pageants are:

Mister República Dominicana Universe Model

Mister República Dominicana Universe Model is a model pageant to select its winner to the Men Universe Model. The pageant previously named Mister Universe Model then renamed Men Universe Model since 2013. Mister República Dominicana Universe Model collaborates MEN UNIVERSE MODEL Company to hold one of the most prestigious male international pageant in the world in the Dominican Republic. This pageant leads by Robert Flores.

On 12 July 2012 Erick Jiménez Sabater announced as the first Men Universe Model 2012 from the Dominican Republic. He overcame Miha Dragos of Slovenia during the final two at 5th annual Men Universe Model pageant.

Mister Turismo República Dominicana

Mister Turismo República Dominicana was a separate pageant that crowned a representative for the Dominican Republic in Mister Tourism International. Dominican Republic has participated since 2002. The pageant constantly held in Panama.

See also
Miss Dominican Republic

References

Dominican Republic
Dominican Republic
Dominican Republic
Recurring events established in 2012
Dominican Republic awards
Mister Global by country